Urbański (feminine: Urbańska, plural: Urbańscy) is a Polish surname. It may refer to:

 Alfred Urbański (1899–1983), Polish politician
 Bartłomiej Urbański, Polish footballer
 Calla Urbanski (born 1960),  American pair skater
 Douglas Urbanski (born 1957) American film producer
 Hubert Urbański (born 1966), Polish television presenter
 Igor Urbanski (born 1970), Ukrainian luger
 Kacper Urbański, Polish footballer
 Krystyna Machnicka-Urbańska (born 1947), Polish fencer
 Krzysztof Urbański (born 1982), Polish conductor
 Mateusz Urbański (born 1990), Polish footballer
 Matthew Urbanski (born 1963), American landscape architect
 Michael Urbanski (born 1956),  America jurist
 Natasza Urbańska, Polish singer
 Tadeusz Urbański (1901–1985), Polish chemist
 Ulrike Urbansky (born 1977), German hurdler
 Wanda Urbanska, American author and television host, and a media, public relations and political strategist  
 Yevgeni Urbansky (1932–1965), Soviet Russian actor

Polish-language surnames